The Wizard of Baghdad is a 1960 American comedy/fantasy film directed by George Sherman and starring Dick Shawn, Diane Baker, and Barry Coe. It was released by 20th Century Fox.

Plot
A genie turned mortal after his many failures is sent to Baghdad. As his last chance to prove himself, he must help a prince and princess fulfill a prophecy.

Cast
 Dick Shawn as Genii-Ali Mahmud
 Diane Baker as Princess Yasmin
 Barry Coe as Prince Husan
 John Van Dreelen as Sultan Jullnar
 Robert F. Simon as Shamadin
 Vaughn Taylor as Norodeen
 Michael David as Chieftain Meroki
 Stanley Adams as Warden Kvetch
 Kim Hamilton as Teegra 
 William Edmonson as Asmodeus
 Fred Scheiwiller as 1st Wrestler
 Stan Molek as 2nd Wrestler

Production
The Wizard of Baghdad was the first film made by Sam Katzman's Clover Productions at 20th Century Fox. He opened offices at Fox in June 1960. (Katzman had spent the past 15 years working almost exclusively for Columbia). The script was written by Jesse Lasy Jr and his wife pat Silver based on an original by Sam Newman Katzman had worked as a set dresser at Fox in the 1920s.

It was the second movie for Dick Shawn, best known as a stage actor. Filming took place in August 1960.

Barry Coe's performance led to Robert Goldstein of Fox signing the actor to a long-term contract with the studio. The movie was part of Goldstein's short tenure while head of Fox, other movies being made including North to Alaska, The Marriage-Go-Round, Sanctuary, The Schnook, Circle of Deception, The Mark, The Millionairess, Esther and the King, The Big Gamble Return to Peyton Place and Flaming Star.

Reception
The Los Angeles Times said the film "should fill the bill as pre Christmas entertainment for the children" through "the funny lines, the slapstick and the trick photography."

The New York Times said the film "is for customers who will laugh at anything, including that singular unfunny man, Dick Shawn... the waste of energy, costumes and backgrounds is truly appalling."

See also
 List of American films of 1961

References

External links
 
 
 

1960 films
1960s fantasy comedy films
20th Century Fox films
CinemaScope films
American fantasy comedy films
1960s English-language films
Films directed by George Sherman
Genies in film
Films set in Baghdad
Films based on One Thousand and One Nights
1960 comedy films
1960s American films